Priya Parathi Valappil is an Indian football coach and former footballer, who is currently the head coach of the India women's U17 team and also is the assistant coach of the India women's football team. She is the first female coach from Kerala to hold the AFC A-licence. In 2020, she led Gokulam Kerala (women) to their maiden Indian Women's League title, which is the top-tier league of women football in India.

Early life and playing career
Priya P.V. was born in Vengara, Madayi, Kannur. She was introduced to football by her father at a very young age. She got selected for the Kerala team in 1997 and went on to play for them till 2009, after which she retired from playing.

Coaching career 
After getting a masters in physical education from Calicut University, she later took a
diploma in coaching from the National Institute of Sport, Patiala. In 2007, she acquired the AFC-C license. Her first achievement as a coach came in 2012 as she led the under-14 India women team to win the AFC under-14 Championship. The team again got the title in 2013 under Priya's stewardship. Later, she became the first women from Kerala to get the AFC-A license in coaching. In 2020, she led Gokulam Kerala (women) to claim their first ever Indian Women's League title.

Honours

Manager

Gokulam Kerala
 Indian Women's League: 2019–20

References

External links 
 

Living people
1976 births
Sportspeople from Kannur
Indian women's footballers
Footballers from Kerala
Indian football coaches
Indian football managers
University of Calicut alumni
Women's association footballers not categorized by position
21st-century Indian women